Pat Bourke (18 November 1894 – 15 September 1982) was a former Australian rules footballer who played with Melbourne in the Victorian Football League (VFL).

Notes

External links 		

		
		
	
1894 births
Australian rules footballers from Victoria (Australia)		
Melbourne Football Club players
Ballarat Football Club players
1982 deaths